The Aetolian War (191–189 BC) was fought between the Romans and their Achaean and Macedonian allies, and the Aetolian League and their allies the kingdom of Athamania. The Aetolians had invited Antiochus III the Great to Greece, who came, but after his defeat by the Romans returned to Asia. This left the Aetolians and the Athamanians without any allies. With Antiochus out of Europe the Romans and their allies attacked the Aetolians. After a year of fighting the Aetolians were defeated and forced to pay 1,000 talents of silver to the Romans.

Prelude 
After the Macedonian defeat in the Second Macedonian War a dispute broke out between the Romans and the Aetolians over the terms of the treaty. The Romans had the backing of the other allies, the Pergamese and the Rhodians and the Aetolians lost the dispute. The Aetolians wanted revenge and in 192 BC they sent out envoys to the King of Sparta, Nabis, King Philip V of Macedon and the Seleucid emperor, Antiochus III the Great. Nabis, who had been forced to comply with humiliating terms in 195 BC after he was defeated by Rome and the Achaean League, accepted, only to be assassinated by the Aetolians. Philip, who was still paying reparations to Rome after his defeat in the Second Macedonian War and had his son as hostage in Rome, refused the offer. Antiochus saw this as an opportunity to expand his European territory, accepted the alliance, and set out to Greece.

Antiochus landed at Demetrias with 10,000 infantry and 500 cavalry and set about trying to recruit some nations into his alliances against Rome. The Romans, alarmed by Antiochus' arrival in Greece, sent the consul Manius Acilius Glabrio with an army to defeat him. The two armies met at Thermopylae, and only 500 of the Seleucids survived. After this defeat, Antiochus and the surviving part of his army returned to Asia. Rome and her allies continued to fight Antiochus in Asia Minor in the Roman–Seleucid War.

Thessalian Campaign 
This left the Aetolians and the Athamanians with no allies and the victorious Roman army marching unopposed in Thessaly. Acilius went with his army to Heraclea and camped there. Acilius sent an envoy to the Aetolian garrison in the city telling them to surrender the city and to think about seeking a pardon for their misjudgment from the Senate. The Aetolians didn't reply and the Romans began preparing to take the city by force.

The Romans started the siege by assaulting the city wall with battering rams. To counter this, the Aetolians made frequent sallies. The siege proved exhausting for the defenders because the Romans had a large number of men and so could replenish the front lines with fresh troops held in reserve, while the Aetolians didn't have enough soldiers to do this.

After twenty-four days of fighting, the consul knew the Aetolians were exhausted from the length of the siege and from the reports that deserters had given him, and thought of a plan. At midnight he gave the signal for all the soldiers to come back to camp. When they returned to camp he kept them inactive until 3:00 am when he ordered that the siege operations begin again. The Aetolians, thinking that the Romans were also exhausted, left their posts and returned at 3am. The consul, knowing that his plan had succeeded, ordered an all-out assault from three different directions. Acilius ordered Tiberius Sempronius, who was in charge of a third of the men, to stay alert and await orders thinking the Aetolians would rush to where the shouting was heard. When the sleeping Aetolians heard the Roman army approaching they hurriedly prepared for battle and tried to make their way to the fighting in the darkness. The Romans started scaling the walls with ladders and climbing over the ruins of some the walls. As all the Aetolians rushed to where the Romans were scaling the walls, Acilius signaled for Sempronius to attack the section of the wall that was left undefended. The Aetolians, seeing Sempronius' group coming, retreated to the citadel. The consul then allowed the victorious soldiers to loot the city.

When the looting finished Acilius ordered the army to be split into two groups. One group was to go around to the other side of the citadel where there was a hill of equal height so the Romans could fire missiles into the citadel from there. The other group was to attack the citadel from the front. Upon seeing the two-pronged attack, the Aetolians decided to surrender. Amongst the people that surrendered was the chief of the Aetolians, Damocritus.

While the Romans were attacking Heraclea, Philip with his army and a few Romans started besieging Lamia, which was seven miles away from Heraclea. The Romans and the Macedonians displayed great energy in the siege, as if they were competing against each other. Since they were making little progress in the siege, Philip met with several of the most prominent, fearing that if the Romans captured Heraclea first, the Lamians would surrender to the Romans. Philip's fears became reality when a Roman messenger ordered him to abandon the siege.

Aetolia 
The Aetolians, still hoping that Antiochus would return to Greece with a new force, sent envoys to him. The envoys were also told that if Antiochus couldn't come to Greece he should send money and reinforcements. Antiochus gave them the money to maintain the war and promised to send reinforcements.

However, the fall of Heraclea broke the Aetolians' fighting spirit and they sent envoys to the Romans. The consul granted them a ten-day truce and he also sent Lucius Valerius Flaccus to parlay with the Aetolians. The Romans demanded the surrender of Dicaarchus, Monestas of Epirus and Amynander of Athamania. The Aetolians decided to obey the Romans and they sent men to collect the requested men. However, a few days later Nicander, one of the envoys who went to Antiochus, arrived back in Aetolia after having been detained by Philip of Macedon. His arrival and news that Antiochus was going to send reinforcements convinced the Aetolians to continue fighting.

When Acilius heard that the Aetolians wouldn't comply with the Roman demands, he marched with his army and started to besiege Naupactus. The siege had lasted for two months when Titus Quinctius Flamininus came to Naupactus. While he was walking around the city walls he was recognised and many people flocked to the city walls and started calling on him to save them. The leading Aetolian citizens went out to meet Flamininus and they agreed that Flamininus would send an envoy to Rome to argue the Aetolians' case. The Roman army then abandoned the siege and went to Phocis.

When the Aetolians returned from Rome and told the Aetolian leaders there was no hope of peace, the Aetolians seized the passage at Mount Corax so they could block off the pass. The Achaeans began ravaging the coast of Aetolia facing the Peloponnese. The Aetolians expected Acilius to attack Naupactus again but instead he launched a sudden attack on Lamia. The Lamians, despite the great confusion, managed to repulse the first attack. Acilius rallied his men and told them to only come back to camp once they had captured the city, which they did, a few hours later.

The Romans, seeing that they couldn't advance to Naupactus, instead attacked Amphissa. The Romans deployed their siege engines and they successfully battered down some parts of the walls. However, the inhabitants continued to hold out until the new consul, Lucius Cornelius Scipio arrived together with his brother Scipio Africanus. Upon their arrival the inhabitants fled the city and locked themselves inside the citadel. Afterwards, Athenian envoys arrived and asked the Romans to consider making peace with the Aetolians.

Conclusion and Treaty  
The Romans dictated a treaty which ultimately made Aetolia a Roman puppet state. They were to fight in any wars the Romans did, while holding the same allies and enemies, as well as the standard fines, exchange of prisoners, and the selection of hostages.

References

Bibliography 
Peter Green. (1991). Alexandeer to Actium: The Historic Evolution of the Hellenistic Age. .
Livy, Titus. (1976). Rome and the Mediterranean. .

190s BC conflicts
180s BC conflicts
2nd century BC in the Roman Republic
Ancient Aetolia
Wars involving the Roman Republic
Wars involving Antigonid Macedon
Wars involving the Aetolian League
Wars involving Athamania
Wars involving the Achaean League
2nd century BC in Greece